Beech Hill is a summit in Herkimer County, New York. It is located north-northwest of Frankfort in the Town of Schuyler. Bell Hill is located north-northwest of Beech Hill.

References

Mountains of Herkimer County, New York
Mountains of New York (state)